Jamie Michelle Luner (born May 12, 1971) is an American actress who first came to prominence as Cindy Lubbock on the ABC sitcom Just the Ten of Us, but is perhaps better known as Peyton Richards on Savannah, Lexi Sterling on Melrose Place and Rachel Burke on Profiler. More recently, Luner portrayed Liza Colby on the ABC soap opera All My Children and Cassie Siletti on Murder in the First. Luner is also well known for her lead roles in many Lifetime movies.

Early life
Luner was born in Palo Alto, California, an affluent suburb in the San Francisco Bay Area, the daughter of Susan, an actress, and Stuart Luner, a sales representative. She was raised in a Jewish family and has an older brother, David.

Career
After guest starring in several episodes of the sitcom Growing Pains, Luner went on to star as Cindy Lubbock in the Growing Pains spinoff, Just the Ten of Us (1988–1990), which also starred Heather Langenkamp, Brooke Theiss and JoAnn Willette as Luner's fictional sisters. At one point in the show, the foursome comprised a fictional singing group, "The Lubbock Babes". To date, Luner is the only one of the four who has not appeared in a Nightmare On Elm Street movie. Luner also guest starred in a Halloween-themed episode of Growing Pains, in which she portrayed a vanishing hitchhiker. After Just the Ten of Us ended, Luner took a break from acting and attended the Epicurian Cooking School, eventually becoming a chef at a popular Los Angeles, California restaurant.

In 1993, Luner returned to television, playing a teenager in the TV movie Moment of Truth: Why My Daughter?, starring opposite Linda Gray. Luner followed this up with a succession of television films, most notably Confessions of a Sorority Girl (1994), which began her extended professional association with producer Aaron Spelling.

Luner's next big break came in 1996, when she was cast as Peyton Richards in Spelling's prime-time soap opera, Savannah (1996–1997). Later in 1997, Luner was cast in Spelling's Melrose Place, playing the role of Lexi Sterling until the series' conclusion in 1999.

In 1999, immediately following the cancellation of Melrose Place, Luner was cast as Rachel Burke, Ally Walker's replacement in NBC's Profiler. She played the role until the show was cancelled at the end of its fourth season in 2000. Following the cancellation of Profiler, Luner continued to work steadily, with guest appearances on several television series including The Outer Limits, CSI: Miami and a three-episode arc on That's Life. In 2000, Luner also starred in the independent feature Sacrifice, along with Michael Madsen.

In 2003, Luner joined the cast of another Spelling drama, playing the role of Senior Deputy Ryan Layne in 10-8: Officers on Duty (2003–2004). The series was cancelled after Luner had appeared in just five episodes. Also in 2003, Luner starred opposite Nicholas Lea in the Sci-Fi Channel original movie Threshold, and in 2004 guest-starred in an episode of NCIS, "Dead Man Talking".

In 2005, Luner appeared in four TV movies for the cable network Lifetime Television: The Suspect (2005), Blind Injustice (2005), Stranger in My Bed (2005) and The Perfect Marriage (2006).

In 2007, Luner appeared as Susan in the comedy Black and Bluestein at the Santa Monica Playhouse. Also that year, Luner starred in Nuclear Hurricane, a Sci-Fi Channel original movie, and made a guest appearance on CSI: Crime Scene Investigation.

In April 2009, Luner joined the cast of All My Children as Liza Colby. (Marcy Walker, who originally played Liza, had retired from show business several years earlier.)  The soap was cancelled in 2011, after which Luner starred in the Lifetime movies Walking the Halls, Stalked at 17 and The Perfect Boss. She then guest-starred in both Supernatural and Criminal Minds in 2013. In 2014, Luner was cast in the Investigation Discovery series Heartbreakers, opposite Jack Wagner and Rob Estes. The following year, she appeared in two more Lifetime movies, The Wrong Girl and The Bride He Bought Online. She also had a recurring role in the second and third seasons of TNT crime drama, Murder in the First, from 2015 to 2016, and guest-starred on Better Call Saul and Code Black. In the following years, she starred in more than ten Lifetime movies, most recently The Christmas High Note (2020), alongside Johnny Messner.

Personal life
In 1995, Luner began dating John Braz, a personal trainer. The relationship ended in 1999.

Legal issues
In February 2018, Luner was accused of drugging and filming a sexual encounter with Anthony Oliver, who had been 16 years old at the time of the alleged incident in 1998. The lawsuit alleged that Luner had offered him whiskey and methamphetamines. However, according to a April 4, 2018 New York Post article, Oliver was registered in California as a vexatious litigator after having burdened the legal system by previously filing 27 frivolous federal lawsuits in an eight-year period. As such, he could not proceed with any court filings without a judge's approval.

On August 6, 2018, the Anthony Oliver lawsuit was dismissed based on the statute of limitations. The judge highlighted the fact that the plaintiff had waited 20 years to file the suit, well after the window had passed on any legal basis for the suit. Luner's team alleged that not only had the legal requirements not been met, but that the plaintiff's claims were actually part of an extortion attempt, and consistent with a history of baseless lawsuits. Nevertheless, the dismissal was appealed on February 2, 2019. In October 2019, Oliver, a one-time mayoral candidate in Savannah, Georgia, was sentenced to 20 years in prison on stalking charges, following 17 years of stalking the victim.

Filmography

Film

Television

References

External links

1971 births
20th-century American actresses
21st-century American actresses
Actresses from California
American film actresses
American soap opera actresses
American television actresses
Jewish American actresses
Living people
Actresses from Palo Alto, California
21st-century American Jews